David Bower (11 April 1819 – 6 July 1898) was a South Australian colonial merchant, politician and Commissioner of Public Works.

Bower was born at Upper Mill in Saddleworth, Yorkshire. In 1841 he emigrated to the Port Phillip District (now Victoria), and after a varied experience in New Zealand and New South Wales, finally settled in South Australia in 1847, where he established a successful business as a timber merchant at Port Adelaide.

On 1 March 1865 Bower was returned to the South Australian House of Assembly as member for Port Adelaide, a seat he held until 4 April 1870. In 1875 was again elected for Port Adelaide, which he represented until 18 March 1887. Bower was Commissioner of Public Works in the John Cox Bray Ministry from April to June 1884. He died 6 July 1898.

References

 

|-

|-

1819 births
1898 deaths
Members of the South Australian House of Assembly
People from Saddleworth
19th-century Australian politicians